Pang Qiong (born October 1, 1970) is a retired Chinese rhythmic gymnast.

She competed for China in the rhythmic gymnastics all-around competition at the 1988 Summer Olympics in Seoul. She tied for 14th place in the qualification round and advanced to the final, ending up in 11th place overall.

References

External links 
 

1970 births
Living people
Chinese rhythmic gymnasts
Gymnasts at the 1988 Summer Olympics
Olympic gymnasts of China
Universiade medalists in gymnastics
Universiade bronze medalists for China
Medalists at the 1991 Summer Universiade
20th-century Chinese women